Pollanisus edwardsi is a moth of the family Zygaenidae. It is found in Australia from southern Queensland to Victoria.

The length of the forewings is 9–11 mm for males and 7–8.5 mm for females, making it the largest species in the genus Pollanisus. There is one generation per year in Victoria and New South Wales and two generations in Queensland.

External links
Australian Faunal Directory
Zygaenid moths of Australia: a revision of the Australian Zygaenidae

Moths of Australia
edwardsi
Moths described in 2005